Amenia may refer to:
Amenia, Illinois
Amenia (town), New York
Amenia (NYCRR station), one of two former railway stations serving the New York town of the same name
Amenia (CDP), New York, a hamlet within the town
Amenia, North Dakota
Amenia (wife of Horemheb), ancient Egyptian
Amenia (fly), a genus of blow-flies

See also 
 Armenia
 Amena (disambiguation)